Charles Burke Elliott (January 6, 1861 – September 18, 1935) was an American jurist.

Born in Morgan County, Ohio, Elliott moved to Iowa with his parents. He graduated from University of Iowa College of Law in 1881 and was admitted to the Iowa bar. He was the lawyer for a land company in Aberdeen, Dakota Territory. Elliott then moved to Minnesota in 1884. He received his doctorate from University of Minnesota in 1887 with a thesis on "The Northeastern Fisheries" and taught at the university from 1890 to 1899. In 1890, Elliott was appointed the Minneapolis, Minnesota municipal court judge and in 1894 was appointed a Minnesota district court judge. During the Spanish–American War, Elliott was adjutant general of the State of Minnesota. Elliott was a Republican. From 1905 to 1909, Elliott served on the Minnesota Supreme Court. In 1909. President William H. Taft appointed Elliott to the Supreme Court of the Philippines and Elliott served until 1912. He then resumed his law practice in Minneapolis. He also wrote several books about the law and the government of the Philippine Islands. He died in Minneapolis, Minnesota after being in ill health.

Notes

External links
 

1861 births
1935 deaths
People from Morgan County, Ohio
Politicians from Aberdeen, South Dakota
Politicians from Minneapolis
University of Iowa College of Law alumni
University of Minnesota alumni
University of Minnesota faculty
Iowa lawyers
South Dakota lawyers
Associate Justices of the Supreme Court of the Philippines
Minnesota state court judges
Justices of the Minnesota Supreme Court
Writers from Minneapolis
Writers from Ohio
Lawyers from Minneapolis